Ravalli County is a county in the southwestern part of the U.S. state of Montana. As of the 2020 census, the population was 44,174. Its county seat is Hamilton.

Ravalli County is part of a north–south mountain valley bordered by the Sapphire Mountains on the East and the Bitterroot Mountains on the West. It is often referred to as the Bitterroot Valley, which is named for the Bitterroot Flower. The county is on the Pacific Ocean side of the Continental Divide, which follows the Idaho-Montana border from Wyoming until Ravalli County. Here, it turns east into Montana, between Chief Joseph Pass and Lost Trail Pass, and follows the Ravalli County-Beaverhead County border.

History

Ravalli County was once home to the Bitterroot Salish tribe. The tribe was first encountered in 1805 by the Lewis and Clark Expedition, which noted their friendly nature. The Catholic Church took an interest in creating a mission in the area, and in 1841 founded St. Mary's Mission, subsequently renamed as Fort Owen. In 1864, the settlement's current name, Stevensville, was adopted. In 1891, the Salish tribe moved to the current Flathead Reservation under the Treaty of Hellgate.

In 1877, Chief Joseph and his Wallowa band of Nez Perce passed through Ravalli County in their attempt to escape confinement to a reservation; they were captured en route to Canada just south of Havre.

Ravalli County was created in 1893 by the Montana Legislature, annexing a portion of Missoula County. It was named after the Italian Jesuit priest Antony Ravalli, who came to the Bitterroot Valley in 1845.

Geography

Major highways
  U.S. Highway 93
  Montana Highway 38

Adjacent counties

 Missoula County - north
 Granite County - northeast
 Deer Lodge County - east
 Beaverhead County - southeast
 Lemhi County, Idaho - south
 Idaho County, Idaho - west/Pacific Time Border

National protected areas
 Bitterroot National Forest (part)
 Lee Metcalf National Wildlife Refuge
 Lolo National Forest (part)

Demographics

2000 census
As of the 2000 United States census, there were 36,070 people, 14,289 households, and 10,188 families in the county. The population density was 15 people per square mile (6/km2). There were 15,946 housing units at an average density of 7 per square mile (3/km2). The racial makeup of the county was 96.71% White, 0.14% Black or African American, 0.88% Native American, 0.30% Asian, 0.10% Pacific Islander, 0.44% from other races, and 1.44% from two or more races. 1.88% of the population were Hispanic or Latino of any race. 22.1% were of German, 14.1% English, 11.1% Irish, 7.9% American and 6.3% Norwegian ancestry.

There were 14,289 households, out of which 30.20% had children under the age of 18 living with them, 60.30% were married couples living together, 7.50% had a female householder with no husband present, and 28.70% were non-families. 24.10% of all households were made up of individuals, and 9.80% had someone living alone who was 65 years of age or older. The average household size was 2.48 and the average family size was 2.94.

The county population contained 25.60% under the age of 18, 6.20% from 18 to 24, 24.70% from 25 to 44, 28.00% from 45 to 64, and 15.50% who were 65 years of age or older. The median age was 41 years. For every 100 females there were 98.60 males. For every 100 females age 18 and over, there were 95.40 males.

The median income for a household in the county was $31,992, and the median income for a family was $38,397. Males had a median income of $30,994 versus $19,987 for females. The per capita income for the county was $17,935. About 9.60% of families and 13.80% of the population were below the poverty line, including 20.10% of those under age 18 and 6.30% of those age 65 or over.

2010 census
As of the 2010 United States census, there were 40,212 people, 16,933 households, and 11,380 families in the county. The racial makeup of the county was 95.9% white, 0.9% American Indian, 0.5% Asian, 0.2% black or African American, 0.1% Pacific islander, 0.6% from other races, and 1.9% from two or more races. Those of Hispanic or Latino origin made up 3.0% of the population. In terms of ancestry, 28.8% were German, 17.4% were English, 15.9% were Irish, 8.3% were American, 5.7% were Italian, and 5.5% were Norwegian.

Of the 16,933 households, 26.5% had children under the age of 18 living with them, 55.5% were married couples living together, 7.7% had a female householder with no husband present, 32.8% were non-families, and 27.1% of all households were made up of individuals. The average household size was 2.35 and the average family size was 2.83. The median age was 46.0 years.

The median income for a household in the county was $43,000 and the median income for a family was $53,004. Males had a median income of $42,065 versus $27,629 for females. The per capita income for the county was $23,908. About 9.6% of families and 15.0% of the population were below the poverty line, including 23.5% of those under age 18 and 6.3% of those age 65 or over.

Economy
Agriculture and timber form the bulk of Ravalli County economic activity. Marcus Daly, one of three Butte copper kings, funded logging operations in the Bitterroot Valley. The lumber was necessary for the Butte copper operation. Recently, more of Ravalli County's economy stems from tourism. The valley borders the Selway-Bitterroot Wilderness and offers a wide variety of wildlife, including some of the few remaining wolverine and wolf populations in the contiguous states. The Lost Trail Powder Mountain ski area is at Lost Trail Pass on the Idaho border on US-93.

Politics
Ravalli County voters have been reliably Republican, opting only one time for the Democratic Party candidate in national elections since 1940 (as of 2020).

Communities

City
 Hamilton

Towns
 Darby
 Pinesdale
 Stevensville

Census-designated places

 Charlos Heights
 Conner
 Corvallis
 Florence
 Sula
 Victor

Unincorporated communities

 Alta
 Bell Crossing
 Cinnibar Court
 Como
 Gorus
 Grantsdale
 Medicine Hot Springs
 Riverside

Notable person
 Henry L. Myers, Ravalli County prosecuting attorney, U.S. Senator from Montana

See also
 List of lakes in Ravalli County, Montana
 List of mountains in Ravalli County, Montana
 National Register of Historic Places listings in Ravalli County MT

References

External links
 

 
1893 establishments in Montana
Populated places established in 1893